Emily Sisson (born October 12, 1991) is an American distance runner who holds the North American record in the marathon, set Oct. 9, 2022, at the 2022 Chicago Marathon, where she ran 2:18:29 to finish second, becoming only the second non-African-born woman to break 2:19. She also owns American record in the half marathon.

Sisson was ninth in the 10,000 meters at the 2017 London IAAF World Championships in Athletics, and won the USATF road 10k Championships in 2016 and 5k in 2018. In the 2019 London Marathon, her first try at the distance, she placed sixth in a time of 2:23:08. In December 2020, she ran the Valencia Half-Marathon in 1:07:26, narrowly missing Molly Huddle’s American record. Sisson subsequently qualified to compete in the 10,000 m run at the 2020 Tokyo Olympics after winning the US Olympic Trials; she finished 10th at the event. On May 7, 2022, clocking 1:07:11, she broke the USA woman's half marathon record at the USATF Half Marathon Championships in Indianapolis. Sisson lowered her own record at the 2023 Houston Half Marathon on Jan. 15, running 66:52 for second place. She runs for New Balance in Flagstaff, Arizona.

High school
Emily Sisson is a four-time high school state champion in cross country while competing at the following Missouri State High School Activities Association and Nebraska School Activities Association schools: Parkway Central High School in Chesterfield, Missouri, Omaha (Nebraska) Marian High School and Millard (Nebraska) North High School. Sisson won a 2 mile in 9:53 before running in her first Diamond League. She also ran a personal best 4:44.02 in the 2010 adidas Jim Ryun Girls Dream Mile at the New York Diamond League in June. At 2009 Foot Locker Cross Country Championships, Sisson finished third in 17:19 behind Chelsey Sveinsson and winner Megan Goethals. 
 Sisson finished 29th at 2008 Foot Locker Cross Country Championships National Finals.

College
Sisson redshirted her first fall at University of Wisconsin before transferring to Providence College to train under Ray Treacy.

At the 2013 NCAA Division I Cross Country Championships, Sisson placed 7th in the 6000m with a time of 20:17.5. Sisson set an NCAA Division 1 indoor track and field 5000 meters record, won three NCAA titles, and earned All-American and All-Big East honors eleven times. While competing for the Wisconsin Badgers during her freshman year, Sisson also earned All-Big Ten honors in cross country, and Big Ten Freshman of the Year honors in both the cross country and outdoor track seasons.

Professional career
On March 29, 2019, running the 10,000 meters in the Stanford Invitational, Sisson beat her training partner and U.S. record-holder Molly Huddle, by 8.9 seconds and lapped the rest of the field.

Competition record

USA National Championships

Road
Sisson won the 2016 Manchester Road Race in 24:06, and finished second to Molly Huddle at 2017 New York Road Runners New York Half Marathon in 1:08:21. She later beat her PR at the Valencia half-marathon in 2020, resulting in nearly an American record; her half marathon time is the US all-time second-fastest. After setting an American debut record at the 2017 United Airlines New York Road Runners New York Half Marathon, Sisson finished second behind Buze Diriba of Ethiopia with a time of 1:12:24 in the 2018 race.

Outdoor track and field

Personal bests
All data sourced from World Athletics profile unless otherwise noted. Data as of October 9, 2022.

References

External links
 
 
 
 Emily Sisson at All-Athletics
 Emily Sisson at Providence Friars
  (Track & Field Results Reporting System)
 Interview post NCAA 5000 meters indoor record at Vimeo

1991 births
Living people
People from Chesterfield, Missouri
Track and field athletes from Missouri
Track and field athletes from Nebraska
American female middle-distance runners
American female long-distance runners
Providence College alumni
USA Outdoor Track and Field Championships winners
Athletes (track and field) at the 2020 Summer Olympics
Olympic track and field athletes of the United States
21st-century American women